The Communist Party of Malaya/Revolutionary Faction was a splinter group of the Communist Party of Malaya. The CPM/RF was engaged in armed struggle. It was founded in September 1970, when the 8th regiment at Sadao Camp broke off from the Communist Party of Malaya, under leadership of Huang Yijiang. In 1983, merged with the Communist Party of Malaya/Marxist–Leninist to form the Malaysian Communist Party in 1983.

See also 
 Malayan People's Liberation Front

References 

Communist parties in Malaysia
Defunct communist militant groups
Defunct political parties in Malaysia
Defunct communist parties
Political history of Malaysia

Political schisms
Year of establishment missing